Bukwo is a town in Eastern Uganda. It is the main municipal, administrative and commercial center of Bukwo District and the headquarters of the district are located there. The district is named after the town.

Location
The town is located on the eastern slopes of the Mount Elgon range, close to the border with Kenya.
The coordinates of the town are:1°17'34.0"N, 34°45'11.0"E (Latitude:1.292764; Longitude:34.753050).

Population
As of May 2014, the exact population of the town of Bukwo is not publicly known.

Points of interest
Te following points of interest lie within the town, or near its borders:
 The headquarters of Bukwo District Administration
 The offices of Bukwo Town Council
 Bukwo Central Market
 Bukwo General Hospital - A public hospital administered by the Uganda Ministry of Health
 Bukwo Training Camp, a running camp that was founded and managed by Italian sports manager Flavio Pascalato in 2014

See also
Bukwo District
Sebei
Eastern Region, Uganda

References

External links
Bukwo District Homepage

Populated places in Eastern Region, Uganda
Bukwo District